Busan International Finance Center(BIFC) is a  skyscraper in Busan, South Korea. The building's construction started in 2011 and finished in 2014. It has 63 floors. The building was developed by Busan Metropolitan City Corporation. It was designed by HAUD and constructed by Hyundai Engineering & Construction. Upon its completion, it became the third tallest building in Busan and the fourth tallest in South Korea.

The building was designed to withstand a 7.0 magnitude earthquake. Besides that, it was also projected as the catalyst for the city's economic growth.

See also
 List of tallest buildings in South Korea
 List of tallest buildings in Busan

Gallery

References

Skyscrapers in Busan
Commercial buildings completed in 2014
2014 establishments in South Korea